Rechargeable lithium metal batteries are secondary lithium metal batteries. They have metallic lithium as a negative electrode, sometimes referred to as the battery anode. The high specific capacity of lithium metal (3,860 mAh g−1), very low redox potential (−3.040 V versus standard hydrogen electrode) and low density (0.59 g cm−3) make it the ideal anode material for high energy density battery technologies. Rechargeable lithium metal batteries can have a long run time due to the high charge density of lithium. Several companies and many academic research groups are currently researching and developing rechargeable lithium metal batteries as they are considered a leading pathway for development beyond lithium-ion batteries.  Some rechargeable lithium metal batteries employ a liquid electrolyte and some employ a solid-state electrolyte.

History
A rechargeable lithium metal battery was commercialized by Moli Energy (now known as E-One Moli Energy) in the 1980s, but after several cells caught fire, devices using Moli batteries were recalled and the company went into receivership.

Research directions
The primary challenges in developing practical rechargeable lithium metal batteries are low cell life due to low Coulombic efficiency, and poor reliability due to dendrite formation causing a short-circuit. Efforts to improve performance center around the choice of electrolyte, since the electrolyte reaction with lithium dictates Coulombic efficiency, and the separator electrolyte must withstand dendrite formation.

Liquid electrolyte
Research directions include high salt systems, additives or fluorine-containing electrolytes that form solid-electrolyte interface (SEI) layers on lithium, and encapsulating lithium inside protective shells.

Solid-state electrolyte
Solid polymer electrolytes such as poly-ethylene oxide (PEO) have been researched for decades but require high temperature, low voltage cathodes, and low current densities to reach reasonable cycle life and reliability. Inorganic-polymer composites have been studied to find a processable, flexible system.  Many inorganic materials families have been studied, including LiPON, lithium borohydride, glassy, semi-crystalline, and crystalline sulfides, NASICON structured phosphates, perovskites, anti-perovskites, and garnets.

Commercialization
Rechargeable lithium metal batteries have been commercialized by Bolloré in the Bluecar program, and thin film batteries with low energy content were sold by Cymbet and others. Several companies are developing rechargeable lithium metal batteries for applications in consumer electronics devices and electric vehicles. The status of the development efforts that have publicly announced data is summarized in the table below.

See also
List of battery types
Lithium battery
Lithium metal battery
Lithium ion battery

References

Rechargeable batteries
Lithium
Battery types